Echoes may refer to:

 Echoes (miniseries), a Netflix original drama series
 Echoes (TV series), a 1988 television series.